Sidi Slimane Echcharraa is a town in Berkane Province, Oriental, Morocco. According to the 2004 census, it has a population of 22,904. It is considered as a suburb of Berkane.

References

Populated places in Berkane Province
Municipalities of Morocco